Sesuatu yang Indah (Something Beautiful) is a 1976 Indonesian drama film directed and written by Wim Umboh. It stars Yatie Octavia, Sophan Sophiaan, Robby Sugara, WD Mochtar and Marini.

References

1976 films
Indonesian drama films
1976 drama films
Films directed by Wim Umboh